In a television studio, a tally light is a small signal-lamp on a professional video camera or monitor. It is usually located just above the lens or on the electronic viewfinder (EVF) and communicates, for the benefit of those in front of the camera as well as the camera operator, that the camera is 'live' - i.e. its signal is being used for the 'main program' at that moment. 

For television productions with more than one camera in a multiple-camera setup, the tally lights are generally illuminated automatically by a vision mixer trigger that is fed to a tally breakout board and then to a special video router designed for tally signals.  The video switcher keeps track of which video sources are selected by the technical director and output to the main program bus.  A switch automatically closes the appropriate electrical contacts to create a circuit, which activates the tally unit located in the camera control units (CCU). 

If more than one camera is on-air simultaneously (as in the case of a dissolve), during the duration of the transition the tally lights of both cameras will remain lit until transition completion. This is also the case when multiple cameras are placed in 'boxes' on screen, sometimes referred to as "picture in picture" mode (PiP) .

Colours & usage 

Tally (also known as the 'on-air' indication) lights are typically red, although some cameras and video switchers accept a preview tally signal, which is typically green.

In addition to the tally lights, an additional light called ISO is sometimes used. ISO is the abbreviation for "isolated", and indicates that the video signal is isolated and recorded separately. When the camera's signal isn't used for the main program, but is being recorded for later video editing, a yellow light indicates to the camera operator that the content might be used at a later stage. So, although not 'on air', the operator should try to prevent making sudden moves etc. The ISO content is typically used for b-roll shots such as people's reactions when it's uncertain if, when, and how they will react.

Film and video terminology
Film and video technology
Television technology
Television terminology